RKVV Westlandia is a football club from Naaldwijk, Netherlands. In the 2017–2018, the Sunday male first squad Westlandia is competing in the Derde Divisie (4th tier),. The Saturday first squad plays in the Eerste Klasse after promoting in 2016.

History
The Sunday first team won a section championship at the 2008–09 Hoofdklasse A. At that time, the Hoofdklasse was the highest tier of Dutch amateur football.

The Saturday first squad has been making fast progress. It started playing in 2004–5 in the Vijfde Klasse. That season it promoted from 5th position. In 2008 it promoted from the Vierde Klasse to the Derde Klasse from 2nd position. In 2012 it promoted to the Tweede Klasse after a section championship. In 2016 it promoted again to the Eerste Klasse, from the runner-up position.

References

External links
 Official site

Football clubs in the Netherlands
1922 establishments in the Netherlands
Association football clubs established in 1922
Football clubs in South Holland
Sport in Westland (municipality), Netherlands
RKVV Westlandia